Mad Norwegian Press is an American publisher of science-fiction guides and novels. The company has worked with authors such as Harlan Ellison, Peter David, Diana Gabaldon, Tanya Huff, Emma Bull, Elizabeth Bear, Mary Robinette Kowal, Seanan McGuire, Barbara Hambly, Martha Wells, Juliet E. McKenna, Aliette de Bodard, Jody Lynn Nye, Catherynne M. Valente, Rachel Swirsky, Melissa Scott, Hal Duncan, Lee Mandelo, Mary Anne Mohanraj, Nancy Holder, Sharon Shinn, Jeanne C. Stein, Colleen Doran, Jill Thompson, Jen Van Meter, Marjorie Liu, Sarah Monette, Mark Waid, Lyda Morehouse, Paul Magrs, Gary Russell, Robert Shearman, Lance Parkin, Andrew Cartmel, Steve Lyons, Lawrence Miles and Tat Wood.

Mad Norwegian was founded by Lars Pearson, a former staffer at Wizard Magazine, and is based in Des Moines, Iowa.

The majority of the company's output is reference guides to science-fiction series such as Doctor Who, Buffy the Vampire Slayer, Angel and The X-Files. As a rule of thumb, such guides examine the continuity that governs each show --- taking into consideration how different episodes reconcile against each other, for instance --- along with critiques, theorizing and behind-the-scenes details. The "About Time" series, a series of guidebooks to Doctor Who, deviates from this formula somewhat by examining the political and cultural context (as well as the development of television) that influenced Doctor Who on a year-by-year basis during its initial 26-year run (from 1963 to 1989).

From 2002 to 2006, Mad Norwegian produced a series of Faction Paradox novels, using concepts and characters as created by Lawrence Miles.

The company has a series of essay collections pertaining to women and fandom: the Hugo-Award-winning Chicks Dig Time Lords (2010), Whedonistas! (2011) and the Hugo-Award-nominated Chicks Dig Comics (2012), and the Hugo-Award-nominated Chicks Unravel Time (2012).

Forthcoming from Mad Norwegian the essay collection Queers Dig Time Lords: A Celebration of Doctor Who by the LGBTQ Fans Who Love It, with an introduction by John Barrowman and Carole E. Barrowman

Women and fandom essay collections by Mad Norwegian Press
Chicks Dig Time Lords: A Celebration of Doctor Who by the Women Who Love It (edited by Lynne M. Thomas and Tara O'Shea with essays by Elizabeth Bear, Carole E. Barrowman, Lisa Bowerman, K. Tempest Bradford, Mary Robinette Kowal, Seanan McGuire, Jody Lynn Nye, Kate Orman, Lloyd Rose, Catherynne M. Valente, Jackie Jenkins, Johanna Mead, Robert Smith?, Christa Dickson and more), 2010  (2011 Hugo Award winner, Best Related Work) 
Whedonistas: A Celebration of the Worlds of Joss Whedon by the Women Who Love Them (edited by Lynne M. Thomas and Deborah Stanish with essays by Elizabeth Bear, Sharon Shinn, Emma Bull, Nancy Holder, Jeanne C. Stein, Seanan McGuire, Sarah Monette, Maria Lima, Jackie Kessler, Catherynne M. Valente, Mariah Huehner, Lyda Morehouse  and more), 2011 
Chicks Dig Comics: A Celebration of Comic Books by the Women Who Love Them (edited by Lynne M. Thomas and Sigrid Ellis with essays by Colleen Doran, Jill Thompson, Jen Van Meter, Marjorie Liu, Sarah Monette, Mark Waid and more), 2012  (2013 Hugo Award nominee, Best Related Work)
Chicks Unravel Time: Women Journey Through Every Season of Doctor Who (edited by Deborah Stanish and L. M. Myles with essays by Diana Gabaldon, Barbara Hambly, Martha Wells, Una McCormack, Juliet E. McKenna, Aliette de Bodard, Seanan McGuire, Rachel Swirsky and more), 2012  (2013 Hugo Award nominee, Best Related Work)

Other essay collections by Mad Norwegian Press
More Digressions: A New Collection of 'But I Digress' Columns (by Peter David, with an introduction by Harlan Ellison), 2009 
Queers Dig Time Lords: A Celebration of Doctor Who by the LGBTQ Fans Who Love it (edited by Sigrid Ellis and Michael Damian Thomas, with an introduction by John Barrowman and Carole E. Barrowman, cover art by Colleen Coover, and essays by Tanya Huff, Paul Magrs, Gary Russell, Melissa Scott, Hal Duncan, Lee Mandelo, Mary Anne Mohanraj and more), forthcoming in 2013

Doctor Who reference guides by Mad Norwegian Press
I, Who: The Unauthorized Guide to Doctor Who Novels (by Lars Pearson), 1999  (out of print)
I, Who 2: The Unauthorized Guide to Doctor Who Novels and Audios (by Lars Pearson), 2001  
I, Who 3: The Unauthorized Guide to Doctor Who Novels and Audios (by Lars Pearson), 2003 
About Time 3: The Unauthorized Guide to Doctor Who (Seasons 7 to 11) (by Lawrence Miles and Tat Wood), 2004  (out of print)
About Time 4: The Unauthorized Guide to Doctor Who (Seasons 12 to 17) (by Lawrence Miles and Tat Wood), 2004 
About Time 5: The Unauthorized Guide to Doctor Who (Seasons 18 to 21) (by Lawrence Miles and Tat Wood), 2005 
About Time 1: The Unauthorized Guide to Doctor Who (Seasons 1 to 3) (by Tat Wood and Lawrence Miles), 2006 
AHistory: An Unauthorized History of the Doctor Who Universe (by Lance Parkin), 2006  (out of print)
About Time 2: The Unauthorized Guide to Doctor Who (Seasons 4 to 6) (by Tat Wood and Lawrence Miles), 2006 
Doctor Who: The Completely Unofficial Encyclopedia (by Steve Lyons and Chris Howarth), 2006  (out of print)
About Time 6: The Unauthorized Guide to Doctor Who (Seasons 22 to 26, the TV Movie) (by Tat Wood, with additional material by Lars Pearson), 2007 
AHistory: An Unauthorized History of the Doctor Who Universe [Second Edition] (written by Lance Parkin with additional material by Lars Pearson), 2007 
About Time 3: The Unauthorized Guide to Doctor Who (Seasons 7 to 11) [Second Edition] (by Tat Wood, with additional material by Lawrence Miles), 2009 
AHistory: An Unauthorized History of the Doctor Who Universe [Third Edition] (written by Lance Parkin and Lars Pearson), 2012 
About Time 7: The Unauthorized Guide to Doctor Who (Series 1 to 2) (by Tat Wood, with additional material by Dorothy Ail), 2013

Doctor Who essay collections by Mad Norwegian Press
Time, Unincorporated 1: The Doctor Who Fanzine Archives (Volume 1: Lance Parkin) (by Lance Parkin), 2009 
Time, Unincorporated 2: The Doctor Who Fanzine Archives (Volume 2: Writings on the Classic Series) (edited by Graeme Burk and Robert Smith? with essays by Matt Jones, Paul Magrs, Kate Orman, Simon Guerrier, Lou Anders, Jim Sangster, and many more), 2010 
Time, Unincorporated 3: The Doctor Who Fanzine Archives (Volume 3: Writings on the New Series) (edited by Graeme Burk and Robert Smith? with essays by Andrew Cartmel, Jonathan Blum, Kate Orman, Lloyd Rose, Steve Lyons, Tammy Garrison, Lynne M. Thomas), 2011

Other Doctor Who books by Mad Norwegian Press
Running Through Corridors: Rob and Toby's Marathon Watch of Doctor Who (Volume 1: The 60s) (by Robert Shearman and Toby Hadoke), 2010

AngeLink novels by Mad Norwegian Press
Resurrection Code (by Lyda Morehouse), 2011

Faction Paradox novels by Mad Norwegian Press
Faction Paradox: The Book of the War (by Lawrence Miles, et al.), 2002 
Faction Paradox: This Town Will Never Let Us Go (by Lawrence Miles), 2003 
Faction Paradox: Of the City of the Saved... (by Philip Purser-Hallard), 2004 
Faction Paradox: Warlords of Utopia (by Lance Parkin), 2004 
Faction Paradox: Warring States (by Mags L Halliday), 2005 
Faction Paradox: Erasing Sherlock (by Kelly Hale), 2006  (out of print)

Science-fiction reference guides published by Mad Norwegian Press
Prime Targets: The Unauthorized Guide to Transformers, Beast Wars & Beast Machines (by Lars Pearson), 2001 
Now You Know: The Unauthorized Guide to GI Joe TV & Comics (by Lars Pearson), 2002 
Dusted: The Unauthorized Guide to Buffy the Vampire Slayer (by Lawrence Miles, Lars Pearson and Christa Dickson), 2003 
Redeemed: The Unauthorized Guide to Angel (by Lars Pearson and Christa Dickson), 2006  (out of print)
Wanting to Believe: A Critical Guide to X-Files, Millennium and The Lone Gunmen (by Robert Shearman), 2009

Notes

External links
 Official site

Book publishing companies of the United States
Publishing companies established in 1999
Companies based in Des Moines, Iowa
1999 establishments in Iowa